Complicated may refer to:

Music

Albums
Complicated (Nivea album), or the title song
Complicated (Tanya Tucker album), or the title song
Complicated (Parmalee EP), or the title song

Songs
"Complicated" (Avril Lavigne song)
"Complicated" (Carolyn Dawn Johnson song)
"Complicated" (Dimitri Vegas & Like Mike and David Guetta song)
"Complicated" (Rihanna song)
"Complicated" (The Cliks song)
"Complicated", by Bon Jovi on their album Have a Nice Day, 2005
"Complicated", by KSI on his album Dissimulation, 2020
"Complicated", by Mac Miller on his album Circles, 2020
"Complicated", by The Rolling Stones on their album Between the Buttons, 1967
“Complicated” by Miss Li, 2020

See also
Complication (disambiguation)
It's Complicated (disambiguation)